Eulepidoptera is a division of lepidopterans in the infraorder Heteroneura.

About 98% of described species of Lepidoptera belong to Ditrysia.

See also 
 Taxonomy of Lepidoptera

References 

 Van Nieukerken, E.J. et al. 2011: Order Lepidoptera Linnaeus, 1758. In: Zhang, Z.-Q. (ed.) 2011: Animal biodiversity: an outline of higher-level classification and survey of taxonomic richness. Zootaxa, 3148: 212–221

External links 
 

 
Taxa described in 1948
Heteroneura